Rafael Acosta Croda (born 27 May 1957) is a Mexican politician affiliated with the PAN. He is currently a deputy of the LXII Legislature of the Mexican Congress representing Veracruz.

References

1957 births
Living people
People from Veracruz (city)
National Action Party (Mexico) politicians
Politicians from Veracruz
21st-century Mexican politicians
Monterrey Institute of Technology and Higher Education alumni
Springfield College (Massachusetts) alumni
Members of the Chamber of Deputies (Mexico) for Veracruz
Deputies of the LXII Legislature of Mexico